Guindon or Guindón may refer to:

People with the surname
Bernie Guindon (born 1942), Canadian outlaw biker and criminal
Bob Guindon (born 1950), Canadian ice hockey player
Bobby Guindon (born 1943), American baseball player
Claudio Guindón (born 1963), Argentine Olympic rower
Dick Guindon (1935-2022), American cartoonist
Fernand Guindon (1917–1985), Canadian politician in Ontario
Jeannine Guindon (1919–2002), Canadian psychology professor
Léo Guindon (1908–1977), Canadian trade union organizer
Luc Guindon (born 1943), Canadian politician in Ontario
Roger Guindon (1920–2012), Canadian priest

Other uses
 Guindon v Canada, a 2015 decision by the Supreme Court of Canada
 Lake Guindon, a lake in Quebec, Canada